Oostburg High School is a public high school located in Oostburg, Wisconsin, United States. Part of the Oostburg School District, the school serves students in grades 9 through 12. Oostburg High School has an enrollment of 310.

Athletics
As of the start of the 2015-16 academic year, Oostburg High School's athletic teams participate in The Big East Conference, which is a part of the Wisconsin Interscholastic Athletic Association (WIAA). Its teams are known as the Dutchmen and Lady Dutch.

Notable alumni
Daniel LeMahieu, legislator

References

External links
 

Public high schools in Wisconsin
Schools in Sheboygan County, Wisconsin